Esopus Spitzenburg or Aesopus Spitzenburgh is a variety of  apple. It was discovered early in the 18th century near Esopus, New York and is reputed to have been a favorite apple of Thomas Jefferson, who planted several of the trees at Monticello.

In 1922, Ulysses Hedrick described Esopus Spitzenburg (sometimes simply called "Spitzenberg") as "one of the leading American apples ... [A]bout the best to eat out of hand, and very good for all culinary purposes as well." In particular, it is a good apple for baking pies and is also valued as a cider apple.

It is fairly large, oblong and has red skin and crisp flesh. Like many late-season apples, it improves with a few weeks of cool storage, which brings it to its full, rich flavor. Hedrick praised this apple as attractive and keeping well in cold storage, but added that it was imperfect in that the trees lack vigor and are vulnerable to apple scab.

This cultivar is suitable for hardiness zones 4–7 and should be grown in full sun. However, the trees grow unevenly and sometimes the upper branches shade out the lower ones, which can be frustrating to the orcharder. It also has a biennial bearing tendency, and is susceptible to any available apple disease.

Herman Melville mentioned this apple in "Bartleby, the Scrivener".

See also
Crimson Gold (apple)

References

External links

Cooking apples